James Edward "Trey" Hardee III (born February 7, 1984, in Birmingham, Alabama) is a retired American track and field athlete who specialized in the combined events. He is a former NCAA Champion, a two-time World Outdoor Champion, a member of the United States 2008 Olympic team, and the silver medalist in the decathlon at the London 2012 Olympics. He was Inducted into the Texas Track and Field Hall of Fame in 2018.

High school and college career
Hardee did not start out as a decathlete. He preferred basketball, and only joined the track and field team as a junior after failing to make the basketball varsity squad at Vestavia Hills High School. He was recruited to Mississippi State University as a pole vaulter. Hardee started college at Mississippi State in 2002. It was at the university that coaches, noting his combination of size and speed, pushed him toward the decathlon and the indoor heptathlon. He finished second in the decathlon at the 2004 NCAA Outdoor Championships.

Mississippi State dropped its indoor track and field program after the 2004 season, so Hardee transferred to the University of Texas. In his first season at Texas, he was third in the heptathlon at the 2005 NCAA Indoor Championships and won the decathlon at the 2005 NCAA Outdoor Championships. In 2006, he set the NCAA decathlon record with a then personal best 8,465 points and was named the 2006 NCAA Division I Men's Indoor Field Athlete of the Year.

Professional career

Hardee was the runner-up in the decathlon at the 2008 US Olympic Trials and made his first Olympic team. At the Olympics, he was in 4th place through seven events when his no-height score in the pole vault cost him a chance to medal. His performances during the 2008 outdoor season garnered interest from the New York Jets of the National Football League, who offered him a tryout. However, he expressed no interest in pursuing the opportunity.

At the 2009 World Athletics Championships in Berlin, Hardee won gold in the decathlon with a points total of 8790, which is his personal record. He was awarded the Jim Thorpe All-Around Award by the United States Sports Academy for his achievements that year. In the same year, he won the USA Outdoor championship with a score of 8,261. At the 2010 IAAF World Indoor Championships, he won a silver medal in the heptathlon by finishing behind Bryan Clay. Hardee finished with a points total of 6184, which was 20 points behind Clay. At the 2011 World Championships in Athletics, Hardee defeated his compatriot Ashton Eaton and retained the world decathlon title with a final points tally of 8607.

In 2012, Hardee again finished second in the Olympic Trials and made a second Olympic Team. On August 9, 2012, he won the silver medal at the London 2012 Olympics behind Eaton. Hardee attempted to make a third Olympic team in 2016, but was unsuccessful due to injury. He did attend the Olympics as a television analyst for NBC Sports.

Personal bests (outdoor)

Last updated April 6, 2016.

PB Decathlon and potential PB

References

External links

 
 
 

1984 births
Living people
American male decathletes
Athletes (track and field) at the 2008 Summer Olympics
Athletes (track and field) at the 2012 Summer Olympics
Olympic silver medalists for the United States in track and field
Medalists at the 2012 Summer Olympics
World Athletics Championships medalists
World Athletics Championships athletes for the United States
Track and field athletes from Birmingham, Alabama
USA Outdoor Track and Field Championships winners
World Athletics Championships winners
Texas Longhorns men's track and field athletes